The year 1879 in science and technology involved some significant events, listed below.

Astronomy
 British children's writer and amateur astronomer Agnes Giberne publishes the popular illustrated book Sun, Moon and Stars: Astronomy for Beginners which sells 24,000 copies on both sides of the Atlantic in twenty years.

Biology
 April 26 – The National Park, later renamed the Royal National Park, is declared in New South Wales, Australia, the world's second oldest purposed national park (after Yellowstone in the United States), and the first to use the term "national park".
 Jean Henri Fabre publishes the first of his Souvenirs entomologiques.
 Heinrich Anton de Bary coins the term symbiosis in his monograph Die Erscheinung der Symbiose (Strasbourg).

Cartography
 Peirce quincuncial projection developed by Charles Sanders Peirce.

Chemistry
 January 2 – Publication of first issue of Journal of the American Chemical Society.
 Per Teodor Cleve discovers the elements holmium and thulium.
 Lars Fredrik Nilson discovers the element scandium.
 Constantin Fahlberg working with Ira Remsen at Johns Hopkins University discovers saccharin.
 Rodolphe Lindt invents the conching machine for use in chocolate manufacture.
 Otto Schott (1851–1935) develops a glass containing Lithium. It was the first glass type that had a Homogeneity allowing spectrometric measurements.

Earth sciences
 Vasily Dokuchaev introduces the concept of pedology, laying the foundations for the modern study of soil science.
 Ferdinand André Fouqué publishes Santorin et ses éruptions, a significant text in volcanology.

History of science
 Carl Schorlemmer publishes  The Rise and Development of Organic Chemistry.

Mathematics
 Charles L. Dodgson publishes Euclid and his Modern Rivals in London.
 Gottlob Frege publishes Begriffsschrift, eine der arithmetischen nachgebildete Formelsprache des reinen Denkens ("Concept-Script: A Formal Language for Pure Thought Modeled on that of Arithmetic") in Halle, a significant text in the development of mathematical logic.
 Felix Klein first describes the Grünbaum–Rigby configuration.

Medicine
 British psychiatrist James Crichton-Browne publishes "On the weight of the brain and its component parts in the insane", a key paper in the neuropathology of insanity.
 Viennese physician Felix von Winiwarter provides an early description of Thromboangiitis obliterans.

Meteorology
 George Stokes perfects the Campbell–Stokes recorder (for sunshine).

Paleontology
 Camptosaurus prestwichii found at Cumnor, near Oxford.

Pharmacology
 Vassili von Anrep of the University of Würzburg demonstrate the analgesic properties of cocaine.

Physics
 Edwin Hall discovers the Hall Effect.
 Joseph Stefan originates the Stefan–Boltzmann law, stating that the total radiation from a black body is proportional to the fourth power of its thermodynamic temperature.

Psychology
 Wilhelm Wundt creates the first laboratory of experimental psychology, at the University of Leipzig.

Technology
 February 3 – Mosley Street in Newcastle upon Tyne (England) becomes the world's first public highway to be lit by the electric incandescent light bulb invented by Joseph Swan.
 May 31 – Werner von Siemens demonstrates the first electric locomotive using an external power source at Berlin.
 June 6 – William Denny and Brothers launch the world's first ocean-going ship to be built of mild steel, the SS Rotomahana, on the River Clyde in Scotland.
 October 22 – Thomas Edison successfully tests a carbon filament thread in an incandescent light bulb.
 A heavy oil engine is built by Jacob Morrison of Norton, County Durham, England.

Awards
 Copley Medal: Rudolf Clausius
 Wollaston Medal: Bernhard Studer

Births
 January 1 – Ernest Jones (died 1958), Welsh psychoanalyst.
 February 1 – Henri Chrétien (died 1956), French astronomer and optical inventor.
 February 22 – J. N. Brønsted (died 1947), Danish physical chemist.
 March 8 – Otto Hahn (died 1968), German physicist and winner of the 1944 Nobel Prize in Chemistry.
 March 10 – Wu Lien-teh (died 1960), Malayan Chinese physician.
 March 14 – Albert Einstein (died 1955), German-born physicist and winner of the 1921 Nobel Prize in Physics.
 May 28 – Milutin Milanković (died 1958), Serbian geophysicist.
 June 3 – Raymond Pearl (died 1940), American biologist.
 August 29 – May Smith (died 1968), English experimental psychologist.
 October 9 – Max von Laue (died 1960), German physicist and winner of the 1914 Nobel Prize in Physics.

Deaths
 January 24 – Heinrich Geißler (born 1814), German scientific instrument maker.
 March 3 – William Kingdon Clifford (born 1845), English geometer.
 April 4 – Heinrich Wilhelm Dove (born 1803), Prussian physicist and climatologist.
 April 16 – Peter Kosler (born 1824), Carniolan geographer and cartographer.
 April 23 – Elisabetta Fiorini Mazzanti (born 1799), Italian botanist.
 May 4 – William Froude (born 1810), English hydrodynamicist.
 May 29 – Pierre Adolphe Piorry (born 1794), French physician.
 August 26 – Édouard Chassaignac (born 1804), French surgeon.
 November 5 – James Clerk Maxwell (born 1831), Scottish-born mathematician and physicist.

References

 
19th century in science
1870s in science